Salesi Halaleva Lapota Fifita (born 29 July 1989) is a Tongan rugby union player who generally plays as a lock. He represents Tonga internationally and currently plays for Irish club Connacht. He is the brother of Vaea Fifita.

Career

Club
Fifita started his professional career in 2016 playing for Waikato, having previously played for Hamilton Old Boys. In February 2017 he trained with the Chiefs development squad, but not play any of the three friendly matches scheduled for the team.

In December 2017 he joined Rugby Pro D2 team FC Grenoble as a replacement for Mickaël Capelli. In March 2018 he extended his contract until June 2019. He later extended his contract for three more seasons. In June 2021 he activated his departure clause early, leaving Grenoble and signing with Irish team Connacht. He made his debut for the club in September 2021.

International
He made his international debut for Tonga against Wales on 16 June 2017. He was also part of the Tongan team which emerged as runners-up to Fiji at the 2017 World Rugby Pacific Nations Cup. He was included in the Tongan squad for the 2019 Rugby World Cup in Japan. He played four games in this competition, against England, Argentina, France and the United States. He was selected again to play against Scotland in Tonga's 2021 tour of the northern hemisphere.

References

External links
 

1989 births
Living people
Waikato rugby union players
FC Grenoble players
Connacht Rugby players
Tongan rugby union players
Tonga international rugby union players
Rugby union locks